Swept Away... by an Unusual Destiny in the Blue Sea of August, usually shortened to Swept Away, is a 1974 Italian romantic adventure comedy drama written and directed by Lina Wertmüller, starring Giancarlo Giannini and Mariangela Melato. The film follows a wealthy woman whose yachting vacation with friends in the Mediterranean Sea takes an unexpected turn when she and one of the boat's crew are separated from the others and they become stranded on a deserted island. The woman's capitalist beliefs and the man's communist convictions clash, but during their struggle to survive their situation, their social roles are reversed.

Swept Away was released to divisive, but largely positive reviews, and won the 1975 National Board of Review of Motion Pictures Award for Top Foreign Film. An English-language remake starring Madonna and directed by her husband Guy Ritchie, was released in 2002.

Plot

An arrogant wealthy woman named Raffaella Pavone Lanzetti is vacationing on a yacht in the Mediterranean Sea with friends—swimming, sunbathing, and talking incessantly about the virtues of her class and the worthlessness of the political left. Her nonstop political monologue infuriates one of the deckhands, Gennarino, a dedicated communist who manages to restrain his opinions to avoid losing his good job. Despite her humiliating insults, Gennarino agrees to take her out on a dinghy late in the evening to see the rest of her friends who have gone ahead without her. On their way, the outboard motor gives out, leaving them stranded in the middle of the sea with no land in sight.

After a night at sea, Gennarino manages to get the motor running again, but has no idea where they are. Eventually they spot an island and head toward it, destroying their dinghy in the process. On land, they discover that there is no one else on the island. Accustomed to having everything done for her, Raffaella begins ordering Gennarino about, but he snaps, refusing to assist her any longer. Raffaella reacts with a string of insults, but he gives as good as he gets, and they split up to explore the island on their own.

Gennarino is soon catching and cooking lobsters. Gradually their roles become reversed. While she has to rely on him for food, Gennarino wants her to be his slave, convinced that women are born to serve men. He even forces her to endure the indignity of washing his underwear. When she reacts in angry defiance, he slaps her around. Gennarino starts to rape her, but then changes his mind, deciding that it would be more satisfying if she gave herself to him willingly.  Later that evening, Raffaella does approach him, and both willingly engage in passionate sex.  He wants her to fall in love with him, and she becomes subservient to him. Eventually they spot a ship, and although they are both reluctant to disrupt their newfound paradise, they signal the ship and are rescued.

After returning home, they soon revert to their former lives and social roles—she once again embracing the upper-class lifestyle of her friends; he returning to a life of a lower-class worker and husband. Abandoned by the object of his desires, Gennarino returns defeated to his sad life and loveless marriage—far removed from an idyllic island in the Mediterranean Sea.

Production

The film was shot along the eastern Sardinian coast, in the province of Nuoro; the sailing yacht that can be seen at the beginning of the movie is the J-class yacht Shamrock V, at that time her name was Quadrifoglio. The beach of the landing of the two shipwrecked is Cala Fuili, in the municipality of Dorgali. The beach of Cala Luna, straddling the municipality of Dorgali and that of Baunei, has been set for another good part of the shooting. The Carunchio refuge and the most sensual scenes were filmed in the dunes of Capo Comino, a town in the municipality of Siniscola. The final scene of the helicopter's departure is set in the port of Arbatax.

Reception

Critical response
In his review in the Chicago Sun-Times, American film critic Roger Ebert gave the film four stars, his highest rating. Ebert wrote that the film "resists the director's most determined attempts to make it a fable about the bourgeoisie and the proletariat, and persists in being about a man and a woman. On that level, it's a great success."

Other reviewers and analysts responded that those who focused on the misogyny simply didn't understand the film's message about class warfare. James Berardinelli defended the film, writing "Those who view this film casually may easily mistake it for a male fantasy... The reality, however, is that Wertmuller is exhibiting the courage to show things that other filmmakers shy away from." John P. Lovell wrote "The sexual violence can be analyzed as political violence within the framework of patriarchal politics and the film's concern with a symbolic presentation of social revolt."

In her review in Jump Cut, Tania Modleski dismissed those justifications, contending that critics would not have been so kind to those who made films which reinforced stereotypes—culminating in violent subjugation—about oppressed ethnic groups, so there was no justification for critics to praise a rape-fantasy film. Responding to the film's message about class warfare, she wrote "So even if Wertmuller wanted to convey only a political message, she has clouded rather than clarified the issues. She should have made both parties male."

On review aggregator website Rotten Tomatoes, the film received a 57% positive rating from top film critics based on 21 reviews, with an average rating of 7.4/10.

Awards and nominations

Remake

The film was remade in 2002 as Swept Away, starring Madonna and directed by her then-husband Guy Ritchie. The film was a critical and commercial failure. The male lead was played by Adriano Giannini, the son of Giancarlo Giannini.

See also
 The Admirable Crichton
 Overboard
 Liza

References
Notes

Citations

Bibliography

External links
 
 

1974 films
1974 comedy films
1974 drama films
1970s adventure comedy-drama films
1970s romantic comedy-drama films
1970s Italian-language films
Italian romantic comedy-drama films
Films directed by Lina Wertmüller
BDSM in films
Commedia all'italiana
Films about communism
Films set in Italy
Films set in the Mediterranean Sea
Films set on uninhabited islands
Films shot in Sardinia
Films scored by Piero Piccioni
1970s Italian films